Polatsk Voblast or Polotsk Oblast was an administrative division in Soviet Belarus. It was created on September 20, 1944. It included territories of eastern Polesia and consisted of 15 raions. The administrative centre was Polatsk.

On January 8, 1954 the Voblast was liquidated and became parts of Vitsebsk and Maladzyechna Voblasts. Thus Polatsk was part of former one.

External links
Administrative divisions of Belarus: history (Russian)

Former subdivisions of Belarus
States and territories established in 1944